Margaret Leppik (born June 5, 1943) is an American politician in the state of Minnesota. She served in the Minnesota House of Representatives.

References

Women state legislators in Minnesota
Republican Party members of the Minnesota House of Representatives
1943 births
Living people
21st-century American women